Mireille Robertine Cottenjé (18 November 1933 Mouscron - 9 January 2006 Bruges) is a Dutch-speaking Belgian writer and nurse. She has published some twenty literary works, novels, books for young people, short stories and plays.

Life 

She studied at the Sisters of the Order of St. Vincent school, Lycée Royal de Bruges, and Bruges Conservatory.  She graduated from Saint-Anne de Mons School in nursing. She studied at the Tropical Institute in Antwerp.

She worked as a nurse in the Belgian Congo.

She was a member of  Actiegroep Gelijke Rechten Man-Vrouw (PAG)  feminist movement. She  traveled to Cuba with the writer Elisabeth Marain.

Works 

 Dagboek van Carla (1968) 
 lava (1973).
 De Heilige kooi (the holy cage) (1974 play)
 Mist (1979) 
 Octopus Schoten : Hadewijch, 1987. 
 Wisselspoor
Works in English
 Journal de Carla translator  Valentine Torck, Bruxelles : La Longue Vue, 1985.

References

External links 

 ‘De voortrekkersrol van Mireille was uitgespeeld’ (indrukmagazine.be)

1933 births
2006 deaths
20th-century Belgian women writers
Belgian nurses
People from Mouscron